Bestum is a former light rail station on the Oslo Tramway.

The station was located at Bestum in Ullern, on the Lilleaker Line, between Ullern Station to the east and Furulund Station to the west.

References

Oslo Tramway stations in Oslo
Disused Oslo Tramway stations
Railway stations opened in 1919
Railway stations closed in 2004
1919 establishments in Norway
2004 disestablishments in Norway